Sylvie Laliberté (born 1959) is a Canadian artist. She works in a variety of areas, including video art, performance art and music. Her work is included in the collections of the Musée national des beaux-arts du Québec, National Gallery of Canada and the Musée d'art contemporain de Montréal.

Awards

 1997 Rendez-vous Québec Cinéma: Quebec Film Critics Association (AQCC) award for best short film for Oh la la du narratif
 1999 Prix Louis-Comtois for the City of Montreal and the Association of Contemporary Art Galleries
 2021 Governor General's Award for French Language Fiction : Finalist for Jʼai montré toutes mes pattes blanches je nʼen ai plus

References

1959 births
Living people
Canadian video artists
Artists from Montreal
Women video artists
20th-century Canadian artists
20th-century Canadian women artists
21st-century Canadian artists
21st-century Canadian women artists